Webster Groves is an inner-ring suburb of St. Louis in St. Louis County, Missouri, United States. The population was 22,995 at the 2010 census.

The city is home to the main campus of Webster University.

Geography
Webster Groves is located at  (38.587702, −90.354366).

Webster Groves is bounded to the east by Shrewsbury, on the north by Maplewood, Brentwood and Rock Hill, to the west by Glendale, Oakland, and Crestwood, and on the south by Affton and Marlborough.

History
In the early 19th century, this region, once a part of the Louisiana Territory, was changing from Spanish to French ownership, and a system of land grants was inaugurated to promote immigration. During the early period of Spanish rule, officials gave land to settlers as a check against the English.

As part of this program, in 1802, Grégoire Sarpy was granted  by Charles de Hault Delassus, the last Spanish lieutenant governor of the Illinois Country. The land grant covered the major area now known as Webster Groves.

Webster Groves' location on the Pacific Railroad line led to its development as a suburb. In the late 19th century, overcrowding, congestion, and unhealthy conditions in St. Louis prompted urban residents to leave the city for quieter, safer surroundings. In 1892 the developers of Webster Park, an early housing subdivision, promoted the new community as the "Queen of the Suburbs", offering residents superb housing options in a country-like atmosphere, as well as a swift commute to downtown St. Louis jobs. The first public school in the community was Douglass Elementary School, founded as a separate but equal school for African-American children in the post-Civil War black community in North Webster. In the 1920s, the school grew into Douglass High School, the only high school in St. Louis County for black students. The school operated until 1956, when the U.S. Supreme Court required desegregation.

As a suburban municipality, Webster Groves has its origins as five separate communities along adjacent railroad lines. Webster, Old Orchard, Webster Park, Tuxedo Park, and Selma merged in 1896 to implement public services and develop a unified city government. Since then, Webster Groves' tree-lined streets and abundance of single family homes have continued to attract people to the area as a "great place to live, work and play", not solely for the wealthy commuter suburb that early developers envisioned but for families that cut across all socioeconomic lines. The geographic and economic diversity of Webster Groves is evident in its variety of neighborhoods.

In the 1960s, Webster Groves was featured in 16 In Webster Groves, a televised documentary that writer Jonathan Franzen, a native of Webster Groves, described in his memoir The Discomfort Zone as an "early experiment in hour-long prime-time sociology". According to Franzen, it depicted Webster Groves High School, which he attended only a few years after the documentary's broadcast, as being "ruled by a tiny elite of 'soshies' who made life gray and marginal for the great majority of students who weren’t 'football captains,' 'cheerleaders' or 'dance queens'"; the school was depicted as having a "student body obsessed with grades, cars and money." Franzen thought "the Webster Groves depicted in it bears minimal resemblance to the friendly, unpretentious town I knew when I was growing up."

Webster Groves was the setting for the 1974–75 NBC television series Lucas Tanner.

In the wake of the 1999 Columbine High School massacre, Webster Groves High School was again profiled, this time in Time, which described Webster Groves as a "pretty town of old elms and deep porches" and a "mix of $90,000 cottages and $750,000 homes, young marrieds and old-line families and transient middle managers assigned to a stint in the St. Louis office who are looking for a comfortable place to settle and keep their kids on the track toward prosperity."

The Webster Groves High School Statesmen maintain one of the oldest high school football rivalries west of the Mississippi River with the Pioneers of Kirkwood High School. The two teams typically play each other in the Missouri Turkey Day Game each Thanksgiving, if their playoff schedules permit it; they also have faced each other in the state playoff tournaments several times in recent years.

Government

As of 2018, Gerry Welch was the mayor of Webster Groves. The Webster Groves City Council consisted of council members Matt Armstrong, Frank Janoski, Bud Bellomo, Laura Arnold, Pamela Bliss, and David Franklin.

The City Council works with 19 boards and commissions (16 active, three inactive). Citizens and businesspeople in the area volunteer for these boards and commissions to advise the City Council on community issues. A full list of these boards and commissions with links to pages describing the purpose and application procedures can be found on the official website of Webster Groves.

The Municipal Court is conducted on the second Wednesday of the month at 5:30 pm and the fourth Wednesday of the month at 6:00 pm in the City Council Chambers at the City Hall. The Prosecuting Attorney is Deborah LeMoine and the Municipal Judge is James Whitney.

Demographics

2020 census
As of 2020, there were 24,010 people living in the city.

2010 census
As of the census of 2010, there were 22,995 people, 9,156 households, and 6,024 families living in the city. The racial makeup of the city was 89.9% White, 6.6% African American, 0.2% Native American, 1.5% Asian, 0.3% from other races, and 1.5% from two or more races. Hispanic or Latino of any race were 1.6% of the population.

There were 9,156 households, of which 32.6% had children under the age of 18 living with them, 54.3% were married couples living together, 8.7% had a female householder with no husband present, 2.8% had a male householder with no wife present, and 34.2% were non-families. 28.9% of all households were made up of individuals, and 13.8% had someone living alone who was 65 years of age or older. The average household size was 2.43 and the average family size was 3.04.

The median age in the city was 40.8 years. 24.6% of residents were under the age of 18; 8.1% were between the ages of 18 and 24; 22.6% were from 25 to 44; 29.2% were from 45 to 64; and 15.4% were 65 years of age or older. The gender makeup of the city was 47.1% male and 52.9% female.

2000 census
As of the census of 2000, there were 23,230 people, 9,498 households, and 6,145 families living in the city. The racial makeup of the city was 90.87% White, 6.38% African American, 1.21% Asian, 0.17% Native American, 0.01% Pacific Islander, 0.31% from other races, and 1.05% from two or more races. Hispanic or Latino of any race were 1.25% of the population.

There were 9,498 households, out of which 31.0% had children under the age of 18 living with them, 53.9% were married couples living together, 9.0% had a female householder with no husband present, and 35.3% were non-families. 30.6% of all households were made up of individuals, and 15.4% had someone living alone who was 65 years of age or older. The average household size was 2.39 and the average family size was 3.03.

In the city, the age distribution of the population shows 24.9% under the age of 18, 7.4% from 18 to 24, 26.7% from 25 to 44, 23.7% from 45 to 64, and 17.3% who were 65 years of age or older. The median age was 40 years. For every 100 females, there were 84.8 males. For every 100 females age 18 and over, there were 79.4 males.

As of 2000 the median income for a household was $60,524, and the median income for a family was $73,998. Males had a median income of $57,801 versus $38,506 for females. The per capita income for the city was $31,327. 4.8% of the population and 2.0% of families were below the poverty line. 5.0% of those under the age of 18 and 3.5% of those 65 and older were living below the poverty line.

Education

The Webster Groves School District serves the city. Webster Groves High School is in the city.

Webster University is in the city.

Private schools in Webster Groves:
 Christ Community Lutheran School 
 Queen of Holy Rosary School
 Holy Cross Academy, a Catholic middle school located at Annunciation Catholic Church.  The school serves several inner-ring suburb Catholic parishes.
 Holy Redeemer, located on Lockwood, has had a Catholic elementary school since 1898.
 Mary Queen of Peace, also on Lockwood, serves Catholics of Webster Groves and adjoining Glendale.  The parish was founded in 1922; the Sisters of Loretto formed the first kindergarten class in 1944.
 Nerinx Hall, an all-girls Catholic high school, was founded by the Sisters of Loretto in 1924.  It adjoins the campus of Webster University, which the sisters founded in 1915. The University is now run by a lay board, while Nerinx remains Catholic.

The St. Louis Japanese School, a weekend supplementary Japanese school, holds its classes at the Sverdrup Business/Technology Complex at Webster University.

Webster Groves has a public library, the City Of Webster Groves Municipal Library.

Landmarks and historic places

Webster Groves is home to:
 Eden Theological Seminary
 Charles W. Ferguson House
 Gorlock Building
 Hawken House
 Nerinx Hall High School
 Opera Theatre of Saint Louis
 The Repertory Theatre of St. Louis
 Rock House, Edgewood Children's Center
 Rockwood Court Apartments
 Tuxedo Park Christian Church
 Tuxedo Park Station
 Webster Groves High School
 Webster University

Registered historic districts in Webster Groves include:
 Webster College-Eden Theological Seminary Collegiate District
 Central Webster Historic District
 Marshall Place Historic District
 Old Webster Historic District
 Webster Park Residential Historic District

Notable people

Notable people who have lived in Webster Groves include:

(Dates in parentheses indicate lifespan, not years of residence.)

 Bruce Alger (1918–2015), Republican U.S. Representative from Dallas, Texas, 1955–1965
 Herbert Blumer (1900–1987), sociologist
 Matt Bomer (born 1977), actor
 Bud Byerly (1920–2012), Major League Baseball pitcher
 George H. Cannon (1915–1941), Medal of Honor recipient
 Harry Caray (1914–1998), baseball broadcaster
 Skip Caray (1939–2008), baseball broadcaster
 Bob Cassilly (1949–2011), artist and founder of the City Museum
 Adrian Clayborn (born 1988), college and professional football player
 David Clewell (1955–2020), Poet Laureate of Missouri 2010–2012
 John J. Cochran (1880–1947), Democratic U.S. Representative from Missouri, 1926–1947
 Ivory Crockett (born 1948), 100-yard dash world-record holder
 Chris Culver, The New York Times bestselling author
 Thomas Bradford Curtis (1911–1993), Republican U.S. Representative from Missouri, 1951–1969
 Michael J. Devlin (born 1965), convicted kidnapper and child molester
 Phyllis Diller (1917–2012), comedian
 Forrest C. Donnell (1884–1980), governor of Missouri, 1941–1945
 Bob Dotson (born 1946), NBC news journalist
 Tim Dunigan (born 1955), actor
 Mary Engelbreit (born 1952), artist and illustrator
 Clay Felker (1925–2008), co-founder of New York magazine
 Lois Florreich (1927–1991), pitcher in the All-American Girls Professional Baseball League, 1943–1950
 Jonathan Franzen (born 1959), National Book Award-winning novelist
 Edward T. Hall (1914–2009), anthropologist
 Robert A. Holekamp (1848–1922), businessman and apiarist
 Alan Hunter (born 1957), original MTV VJ, radio host, and film and TV producer
 Gordon Jenkins (1910–1984), music arranger
 Josephine Johnson (1910–1990), Pulitzer Prize-winning novelist
 John Keene (born 1965), writer, translator, artist, academic
 Matt Kindt (born 1973), comic book artist and graphic designer
 Karlie Kloss (born 1992), model
 Jim Krebs (1935–1965), NBA basketball player, Minneapolis/Los Angeles Lakers
 Frederick Kreismann (1869–1944), mayor of St. Louis, 1909–1913
 Hank Kuhlmann (born 1937), college and professional football coach
 Jack Lorenz (1939–2009), environmental activist
 John Lutz (1939–2021), mystery writer
 Marguerite Martyn (1878–1948), reporter and artist
 Scott Mayfield (born 1992), ice hockey player
 Kathleen Mazzarella, Chairman, President and CEO of Graybar
 Danny McCarthy, actor
 Louis Metcalf (1905–1981), jazz cornetist
 Russ Mitchell (born 1960), news anchor of The Early Show on CBS
 Keith W. Nolan (1964–2009), military historian
 Scott Phillips (born 1961), writer
 Edward M. Rice (born 1960), Auxiliary Bishop of the Roman Catholic Archdiocese of St. Louis, Dec. 2010–present
 Drew Sarich (born 1975), actor, musical theater
 George Schlatter (born 1932), American television comedy producer and director
 Jane Smiley (born 1949), Pulitzer Prize-winning novelist
 Phoebe Snetsinger (1931–1999), birdwatcher
 William H. Webster (born 1924), FBI and CIA director

References

General references:

Further reading
 Marilynne Bradley. Arpens and Acres: A Brief History of Webster Groves, Missouri. Bradley, [1975].
 Marilynne Bradley. City of Century Homes: A Centennial History of Webster Groves, Missouri. Webster Groves Historic Preservation Commission, 1996.
 Mary Jo Mahley and Toni McCoy. The Rock Beneath, 100 Years Ago in Webster Groves. Century Registry, 1996.
 Ann Morris and Henrietta Ambrose. North Webster: A Photographic History of a Black Community (with photographic restorations by John Nagel). Indiana University Press, c1993.
 Clarissa Start. Webster Groves. City of Webster Groves, c1975.
 Wilda H. Swift and Cynthia S. Easterling. Webster Park: 1892–1992. Easterling, 2003 (1992).
 Ariadne Thompson. The Octagonal Heart. Bobbs-Merrill, 1956; and Webster Groves Bookshop, 1976.

External links
 City of Webster Groves official website
 Webster Historical Society
 Historic maps of Webster Groves in the Sanborn Maps of Missouri Collection at the University of Missouri

Cities in St. Louis County, Missouri
Cities in Missouri